Carl Peter Holbøll (1795–1856) was an officer in the Danish Royal Navy, Greenland colonial officer and explorer of the Greenlandic fauna.

Holbøll served as Royal Inspector of Colonies and Whaling in North Greenland (1825–1828), then Inspector of South Greenland (1828–1856). While in this post he became interested in natural history. His main contribution was to send large amounts of faunistic collections to the zoologists in Copenhagen. For example, professor Johannes Theodor Reinhardt described the North American form of the red-necked grebe and named it Podiceps holboellii (now Podiceps grisegena holboellii). Holbøll himself also wrote a treatise on Greenlandic birds. In the paper, he described the hoary redpoll (Linota hornemanni, now known as Carduelis hornemanni), which he named for the botanist Jens Wilken Hornemann. Hornemann had previously received plant collections from Holbøll and named a new species Arabis holboellii (now known as Boechera holboellii).

Holbøll was also a skilled amateur botanist and entomologist.
He wrote a school book for mathematics teaching in Greenland, which was used for about a century.

After a visit to Denmark, he travelled back to Greenland on the brig Baldur, which went down on its way. All on board were lost.

Commemoration of Holbøll in species' names 
 Krøyer's deep sea angler fish Ceratias holboelli (Krøyer, 1845) (Ceratiidae)
 Amphipod Phoxocephalus holboelli (Krøyer, 1842) (Phoxocephalidae)
 Amphipod Hippomedon holboelli (Krøyer, 1846) (Lysianassidae)
 Marine gastropod Colus holboelli (Møller, 1842) (Buccinidae)
 Marine gastropod Dolabrifera holboelli Bergh, 1872 (Aplysiidae)
 Freshwater gastropod Lymnaea holboelli (Møller, 1842) (Lymnaeidae)
 Flowering plant Boechera holboellii (Hornem.) Á.Löve & D.Löve (Brassicaceae)

References

Biographical Appendix of The Dictionary of American Bird Names, Revised Edition, by Ernest A. Choate, The Harvard Common Press, 1985.Biographical information indicates Mr. Holboell died at sea.
Henriksen, K. L. (1926) C. P. Holbøll. Entomologiske Meddelelser. 15 (5): 195, with portrait.

18th-century Danish naval officers
Danish ornithologists
Danish naturalists
Danish entomologists
Inspectors of Greenland
1795 births
1856 deaths